World Rugby is the world governing body for the sport of rugby union.

Other uses
 World Rugby (video game), published by Zeppelin Games in 1993.

See also
 Rugby League International Federation, the world governing body for the sport of rugby league.
 Rugby World, a monthly sports magazine covering rugby, first published in October 1960.
 World Rugby Museum, a collection of rugby memorabilia in London, formerly known as ‘The Museum of Rugby’.